Daryl Lawrence Jones (born February 2, 1979) is a former American football wide receiver in the National Football League. He was drafted by the New York Giants in the seventh round of the 2002 NFL Draft. He played college football at Miami. Jones later played for the Chicago Bears and the Minnesota Vikings.

References

External links
Miami Hurricanes bio

1979 births
Living people
American football wide receivers
Miami Hurricanes football players
New York Giants players
Chicago Bears players
Minnesota Vikings players